The men's featherweight (57 kg/125.4 lbs) K-1 category at the W.A.K.O. World Championships 2007 in Belgrade was the second lightest of the K-1 tournaments, involving nine fighters from three continents (Europe, Africa and South America).  Each of the matches was three rounds of two minutes each and were fought under K-1 rules.

Due to the small number of contestants inappropriate for a sixteen-man tournament, seven of the fighters had byes through to the quarter finals. The tournament winner was Ukraine's Maksym Glubochenko, who won the gold medal by defeating Serbia's Aleksandar Gogic. Defeated semi-finalists Gaetano Verziere (from Italy) and Yury Satsuk (from Belarus) won bronze medals.

Results

See also
List of WAKO Amateur World Championships
List of WAKO Amateur European Championships
List of male kickboxers

References

External links
 WAKO World Association of Kickboxing Organizations Official Site

Kickboxing events at the WAKO World Championships 2007 Belgrade
2007 in kickboxing
Kickboxing in Serbia